Yongsoon is a 2016 South Korean drama film directed by Shin Joon.

Plot
Story of a teenage girl who discovers young love when she falls for her school's athletics team coach.

Cast
Lee Soo-kyung as Yong-soon
 Kim Ha-yeon as Young Yong-soon
Choi Deok-moon as Father
Kim Dong-young as Bbak-gyu
Park Keun-rok as Che-yook
Jang Haet-sal as Moon-hee
Choi Yeo-jin as English teacher
Choi Chan-sook as Che-yook's mother

Awards and nominations

References

External links

2016 films
2010s coming-of-age drama films
South Korean coming-of-age drama films
Lotte Entertainment films
2016 drama films
2010s Korean-language films
2010s South Korean films